Costel Pană (born 15 July 1967) is a retired Romanian football midfielder. He won the Liga I title with Dinamo București playing alongside his brother, the defender Marian who was also an international footballer. After he ended his playing career, he worked as a manager.

International career
Costel Pană played six games at international level for Romania, making his debut in a 1994 World Cup qualification match which ended with a 7–0 victory against Faroe Islands, in which he scored the 6th goal of the game.

Honours

PLAYER

ASSISTANT COACH

HEAD COACH

ROMANIA

SAUDI ARABIA (KSA) 

In 2011 he graduated from the Federal School for Coaches of the Romanian Football Federation obtaining UEFA Pro diploma.

References

External links

1967 births
Living people
Romanian footballers
Romania international footballers
Association football midfielders
CSM Flacăra Moreni players
FC Dinamo București players
Neuchâtel Xamax FCS players
FCM Bacău players
FC Argeș Pitești players
FC Brașov (1936) players
Liga I players
Liga II players
Swiss Super League players
Romanian expatriate footballers
Expatriate footballers in Switzerland
Romanian expatriate sportspeople in Switzerland
Romanian football managers
FCM Bacău managers
AFC Chindia Târgoviște managers
LPS HD Clinceni managers